Eugenio Cerboneschi (15 January 1889 – 15 July 1955) was an Italian equestrian. He competed in two events at the 1928 Summer Olympics.

References

External links
 

1889 births
1955 deaths
Italian male equestrians
Olympic equestrians of Italy
Equestrians at the 1928 Summer Olympics